Bertie may refer to:

People
Bertie (given name)
Bertie (nickname)
Bertie (surname)

Places
 Bertie County, North Carolina
 Bertie Township, subsequently amalgamated into Fort Erie, Ontario, Canada

Other uses
 Bertie (TV series), a 2008 miniseries  documenting the life of former Taoiseach Bertie Ahern
 Bertie Correctional Institution, Windsor, North Carolina, a state men's prison
 Bertie High School, Windsor, North Carolina
 Bertie Memorial Hospital, Windsor, Bertie, County, North Carolina
 Bertie the bus, a fictional character from The Railway Series books and it’s TV series adaptation Thomas the Tank Engine and Friends

See also
 Bert (name)
 Berti, a given name and Italian surname
 Bertrand (disambiguation)
 Berty (disambiguation), a given name and surname